Trichophoroides is a genus of beetles in the family Cerambycidae, containing the following species:

 Trichophoroides albisparsus (Bates, 1872)
 Trichophoroides aurivillii (Linsley, 1961)
 Trichophoroides decipiens (Bates, 1880)
 Trichophoroides dozieri (Fisher, 1932)
 Trichophoroides jansoni (Bates, 1885)
 Trichophoroides niveus Linsley, 1935
 Trichophoroides pilicornis (Fuchs, 1961)
 Trichophoroides signaticolle (Chevrolat, 1862)
 Trichophoroides variolosum (Fisher, 1947)

References

Elaphidiini